William Wigston may refer to:

William Wyggeston, merchant
William Wigston (MP) (by 1509–1577), MP for Leicester and Warwickshire
William Bernard Wigston, founder of the oldest language bookshop, Foreign Language Bookshop, in Australasia